In social psychology, social salience is the extent to which a particular target draws the attention of an observer or group. The target may be a physical object or a person. If the target is a person, they may be alone or a member of a group (of which the observer may also be a part) or else in a situation of interpersonal communication. It is based on the way a particular feature can be linked to a certain type of speaker, who is then associated with social and emotional evaluations. These evaluations are then transferred to the linguistic feature.

An observer's attention may be drawn to a target as a result of certain general features of that target. These features include:

 General object attributes – vivid colors, object's proximity to observer
 Difference between object attribute and its immediate environment.
 Difference between observer's expectations of an object and the observable attributes of that object.
 Observer's goal – an object that matches goal-oriented searching.

Social salience allows for observers to quickly detect changes in their environment. Given the limited cognitive capacity of humans, this is advantageous but can lead to biases and misperceptions as in the case of the representativeness heuristic. Awareness of this heuristic does not always completely mitigate its effect. 

Social salience is also distinguished from cognitive salience in the sense that it consists of the variation along with attitudes, cultural stereotypes, and social values associated with it. In addition, the variation has already been used to carry social indexation. On the other hand, cognitive salience pertains to the objective property of linguistic variation that allows language users to pick up on it.

Social salience of objects 
While there are colors and patterns that are objectively more vivid, salience is a function of the difference between the target object and its environment, or "ground". The greater the difference between the target and the ground, the stronger the social salience of that target. In the case of social salience, this distinction is characterized as a comparison between the attributes of the target and the attributes of other items in the target's proximal ground. Other items in the target's proximal ground set the norm for attributes an observer can expect. When an object’s attributes violate those pre-set expectations, it is socially salient.

The strength of an object's social salience may also be underscored when it is the target of a goal-oriented search by an observer. An observer looking for a target object is more attuned to the object’s attributes and will be able to pick them out more rapidly from a crowd.

Social salience of people 
The social salience of an individual is a compilation of that individual's salient attributes. These may be changes to dress or physical attributes with respect to a previous point in time or with respect to the surrounding environment 
Salient attributes of an individual may include the following:
 Clothing (e.g., boldly patterned clothing)
 Manipulation to physical appearance (e.g., novel hair color)
 Accessory that is infrequent in presence across the general population or indicative of an individual change (e.g., a leg brace)

The social salience of an individual in a group is defined both by individual salient attributes and comparison with the attributes of other members of the group. As with the salience of objects, the social salience of an individual in a group depends on the attributes of the other members of that group. Little is known about social salience between groups but within-group preferences lead to greater social salience for members of an observer’s own group than for members outside of the group or in a different group.
Salient attributes of an individual in a group may include the following:
 Activeness
 Trustworthiness
 Friendliness
 Volume of speech
 Reliability

Moderators of social salience

Negative Moderators of Social Salience 
Machines with multiple channels of communication allow for interpersonal communication among many active parties. Fewer channels lead to a decreased social salience of other members as perceived by any one participant. Compared with direct communication, communication over digital interfaces result in fewer nonverbal cues that provide necessary information as to the relationships between participants (status-specific or otherwise) as well as other social context. As a result, communication over digital interfaces is less personable and less productive than in-person communication.

Positive Moderators of Social Salience 
Oxytocin has a positive impact on the awareness of social cues in individuals with social impairment. The release of oxytocin both mediates directly prosocial behavior and increases perception of social salience.

The salience of mortality is also an active moderator of social salience. Mechanistically, increasing salience of mortality increases fear of isolation and thereby improves the rate of altruistic pro-social behavior. This spurs awareness of relevant social cues leading to increased social salience.

Notes

References
McArthur & Ginsberg, 1981
Robbins & Krueger, 2005
Walther et al., 1994

Social psychology